KTWD (103.5 FM) is a radio station licensed to Wallace, Idaho, United States. The station is currently owned by Penfold Communications.

History
The station was assigned the call sign KQWK on 1997-03-31. On 2001-02-05, the station changed its call sign to the current KTWD.

On July 7, 2015, KTWD moved from 97.5 FM to 103.5 FM and returned to the air on July 8 with a simulcast of KRTM's Christian radio format. The station was licensed by the Federal Communications Commission to operate on 103.5 FM on August 3, 2015.

References

External links

Radio stations established in 2001
TWD